Volodymyr Yevseviyovych Kistion (31 May 1965 in Dovzhok, Vinnytsia Oblast) is a Ukrainian biochemist and politician.

In the 2019 Ukrainian parliamentary election, Kistion ran an unsuccessful campaign for the Ukrainian parliament in Ukraine's 11th electoral district, based in Vinnytsia He came in fifth place, receiving 9.37% of the overall vote. Maksym Pashkovsky, a candidate from the Servant of the People party, won 26.39% of the vote and took first place. After this election, Kistion, as the next in line, took the seat in the Vinnytsia Oblast Regional Parliament of a European Solidarity MP who was elected  to the Verkhovna Rada (Ukraine's national parliament).

References

1965 births
Living people
People from Vinnytsia Oblast
National Academy of State Administration alumni
Ukrainian biochemists
Vice Prime Ministers of Ukraine